Ikurin Vire (abbreviated Vire) is a football club from Tampere, Finland that was established in 1957.  Vire currently plays in the Kutonen with its home venue at the Ikurin Virelä.

Divisional Movements

Seventh Level (3 seasons): 2011, 2012, 2013

Season to season

2011 season

Vire are competing in the Kutonen administered by the Tampere SPL.  This is the seventh highest tier in the Finnish football system.

Current squad

Boardroom

Field staff

References and sources
Official Ikurin Vire website
Official Ikurin Vire Football Section website
The Finnish Cup
The Finnish Regions'Cup

Football clubs in Finland
Association football clubs established in 1957
1957 establishments in Finland